Torfajökull (Icelandic for "Torfi's glacier") is a rhyolitic stratovolcano, caldera (central volcano) and complex of subglacial volcanoes, located north of Mýrdalsjökull and south of Þórisvatn Lake, Iceland. Torfajökull last erupted in 1477 and consists of the largest area of silicic extrusive rocks in Iceland.

The volcano's eruption around 870, a combined bimodal eruption (rhyolite-basalt) with additional engagement of the Bárðarbunga-Veiðivötn volcanic system, has left a thin layer of easily recognized mixed tephra all over Iceland (Landnámslag). This layer makes it possible to determine the exact dates of many archeological finds by so called tephrochronology, like in the Reykjavík 871±2 museum.

Naming

According to legend, the glacier is named for Torfi Jónsson í Klofa, an Icelandic historical figure. When the plague arrived in Iceland in 1493, Torfi fled with his family and his belongings into the highlands and settled in a valley surrounded by the glacier.

According to another legend, the glacier is named for Torfi, a farm worker at a nearby farm. Torfi eloped with the farmer's daughter and fled to the glacier.

See also
 List of volcanoes in Iceland
 Volcanism of Iceland

References

External links
 Torfajökull in the Catalogue of Icelandic Volcanoes
 

Tuyas of Iceland
Pleistocene stratovolcanoes
Holocene stratovolcanoes
Active volcanoes
VEI-3 volcanoes
Southern Region (Iceland)
East Volcanic Zone of Iceland
Glaciers of Iceland
Subglacial volcanoes of Iceland
Volcanic systems of Iceland
Central volcanoes of Iceland
Calderas of Iceland